Ndola People are found in Taraba, Nigeria and located in Kurmi and Ngada. Few are also found in Cameroon.

Background
Ndola is a tribe or an ethnic group of people found in Taraba State, Nigeria with an estimated population of about one hundred thousand (100,000). Ndola are also found in Dodéo, Adamaoua Region in Cameroon and their population is estimated at about 4,000.
Ndola is sometimes called by other people in Nigeria as Ndoro; Ndoola; Nundoro; while in Cameroon it is also called Njoyame. Ndola is in the Benue-Congo language families, with a parent subgroup of Mambiloid tribes. Other tribes in this group which have similar phonology are: Mambila, Suga, Kwanja, Vute, Kamkam, Twendi and Wawa. Most of these languages are found around the Mambila Plateau region. Ndola people are also found in the low land areas of Kurmi which is their most dominant land, Gashaka, Bali and Donga. In Kurmi Local Government, the Ndola people owns its headquarters, which is in Ba'Issa. Ba'Issa is in two words: "Ba", a Ndola word, meaning Daddy, while "Issa" is a Hausa name meaning Jesus. The name of the first settler and owner of the land was called Issa. Whenever visitors want to visit him from other surrounding villages or communities, they will always say "We will be going to see Ba'Issa". This name was also adopted by the Missionaries who first visited the area in the early 1900. This is the name of the town used till date, and it eventually became the headquarters of Kurmi Local Government.

References

Ethnic groups in Nigeria
Taraba State